Luuk de Jong (born 27 August 1990) is a Dutch professional footballer who plays as a striker for Eredivisie club PSV Eindhoven.

De Jong previously played for DZC '68, De Graafschap, Twente, Borussia Mönchengladbach and Newcastle United, before joining PSV in 2014. He played over 200 games for the club, scoring over 100 goals, and helped them win the Eredivisie three times in his five-season stay. In 2019, he joined Sevilla, before going out on loan to Barcelona in 2021. He re-joined PSV in 2022.

A former Dutch international, De Jong represented the Netherlands at UEFA Euro 2012, Euro 2020 and the 2022 FIFA World Cup.

Early life
De Jong was born in Aigle, Switzerland.

Club career

Twente

On 20 August 2011, De Jong scored his first Eredivisie goal of the 2011–12 season in a 5–1 demolition of Heerenveen. The following week, on De Jong's 21st birthday, he found the back of the net two more times as Twente smashed VVV Venlo 4–1.

De Jong scored two goals against Waalwijk on 21 January 2012 – a tap in to an open goal and a penalty – as Twente ran out 5–0 winners. In Twente's following fixture against Groningen on 29 January, De Jong netted a hat-trick, each goal coming off an assist from Ola John, and provided an assist for Leroy Fer, as his side won 4–1 and climbed to second place in the league table. On 10 February, De Jong found the back of the net two more times, but Twente missed the chance to go top of the league table, as they lost 3–2 at home to Heracles. De Jong's two goals meant he had scored seven times in the past three Eredivisie fixtures.

On 8 March, in a Europa League match against Schalke 04, De Jong was the protagonist of a controversial penalty decision that resulted in a red card for Schalke defender Joël Matip, and a penalty kick which he himself successfully converted, to ensure the win for his side by 1–0. However, Twente ended up falling out of the competition, losing 4–1 in the second leg in Germany, as de Jong's fellow Dutchman Klaas-Jan Huntelaar netted a hat-trick.

De Jong scored twice in two minutes on 14 April to put his side 2–1 up away to Breda, but an injury-time strike from Nourdin Boukhari denied Twente the chance to close the gap on title rivals Ajax. He finished the season with 25 goals on a joint-second place, seven behind top-scorer Bas Dost.

At the end of the 2011–12 season, De Jong announced his decision to leave the club. Having attracted the interest of several clubs around Europe, including Premier League side Newcastle United, de Jong accused the club's chairman Joop Munsterman of increasing the asking price for him. In response, the Munsterman and Steve McClaren expressed dismay over de Jong's comments.

Borussia Mönchengladbach
On 18 July 2012, De Jong signed for Bundesliga side Borussia Mönchengladbach on a five-year deal, with a fee of €15 million (£12.6m), having stated it was his dream to join. Eight months later after the move, de Jong stated the Bundesliga was "a great place to develop as a player".

He made his debut with Mönchengladbach in a match against Munich 1860; his team ended up winning 4–2, however, De Jong was quite anonymous during his first match, failing to score or assist any goals. On 21 August, he started his first European game for Mönchengladbach and in the process scored an own goal from a free kick in a 3–1 defeat at the hands of Dynamo Kyiv during the Champions League Qualifiers. On 15 September, he scored his first goal for the club in a 3–2 defeat to 1. Nürnberg, converting a tap in after a cross from Patrick Herrmann. However, later in the season, De Jong's first team opportunities soon faded after falling out with manager Lucien Favre, and only made 23 appearances, scoring six times. Towards the end of the season, De Jong reiterated he was confident he could prove himself as the best striker.

However, in the 2013–14 season, De Jong's first team place remained limited, as his playing minutes significantly decreased and made 14 appearances in the first half of the season.

Newcastle United (loan)
On 29 January 2014, De Jong completed a loan signing with Premier League side Newcastle United until the end of the 2013–14 season. He made his debut on 1 February in the Tyne-Wear derby against Sunderland. In May 2014, it was announced that de Jong would be returning to Borussia Mönchengladbach after he failed to score in any of his twelve appearances for Newcastle.

PSV
On 12 July 2014, De Jong signed a five-year deal with PSV for a fee of €5.5m. Following his move to PSV, De Jong said he felt he had made a mistake by moving to Germany.

De Jong made his official debut for the club, where he scored in both legs, as PSV beat St. Pölten 4–2 on aggregate in the third round of Europa League. It took until 31 August 2014 for De Jong to score his first league goal for the club, in a 2–0 win over Vitesse Arnhem.

On 17 December 2014, De Jong scored his first hat-trick for the club in a 4–3 home win over Feyenoord, and his second on 13 February 2015 in a 4–2 away win over AZ Alkmaar. He also scored twice on 18 April, as the team defeated Heerenveen 4–1 for their 22nd Eredivisie title and first since 2008.

On 2 August 2015, De Jong scored a double to help PSV clinch the 2015 Johan Cruyff Shield.

Sevilla
On 1 July 2019, De Jong signed a four-year contract with Spanish club Sevilla. On 16 August 2020, de Jong scored the winning goal in a 2–1 victory over Manchester United in the semi-finals of the UEFA Europa League. On 21 August, he scored twice in a 3–2 win over Inter Milan in the final, whilst being named the man of the match. With his performance in the Europa League, he subsequently was named in the Squad of the Season.

On 28 October 2020, he scored the only goal in a 1–0 win against Rennes in the 2020–21 UEFA Champions League group stage.

Barcelona (loan)
On 31 August 2021, De Jong joined Barcelona on a season-long loan until 30 June 2022. On 23 September, he made his debut in a goalless draw against Cádiz, starting and playing 67 minutes before being substituted for Philippe Coutinho. Three days later, he scored his first goal for the club, assisted by Sergiño Dest, in a 3–0 La Liga victory over Levante.

Return to PSV
On 2 July 2022, De Jong rejoined PSV from Sevilla on a three-year contract.

International career

De Jong received his first call-up for the Netherlands senior team for a friendly against Austria on 9 February 2011, making his debut in the same match, replacing Dirk Kuyt.

He scored his first international goal on 6 September 2011, in a 2–0 win during the UEFA Euro 2012 qualifying game against Finland that secured the Netherlands qualification to the finals.

On 7 May 2012, he was named in the provisional list of 36 players for UEFA Euro 2012 by Netherlands manager Bert van Marwijk. He was one of the 23 players chosen to represent the team in the tournament, but did not make any appearances.

De Jong was included in the Netherlands squad for both Euro 2020 and the 2022 FIFA World Cup.

On 3 March 2023, De Jong officially announced his retirement from the national team.

Career statistics

Club

International

Scores and results list Netherlands' goal tally first.

Honours
Twente
Eredivisie: 2009–10
KNVB Cup: 2010–11
Johan Cruyff Shield: 2010, 2011

PSV
Eredivisie: 2014–15, 2015–16, 2017–18
Johan Cruyff Shield: 2015, 2016, 2022

Sevilla
UEFA Europa League: 2019–20

Individual
 Eredivisie Top Scorer: 2018–19 (shared with Dušan Tadić)
Eredivisie Team of the Year: 2017–18, 2018–19
UEFA Europa League Squad of the Season: 2019–20

References

External links

Profile at the PSV Eindhoven website

Netherlands U19 stats at OnsOranje 
Netherlands U21 stats at OnsOranje 

1990 births
Living people
People from Aigle
Dutch footballers
Association football forwards
DZC '68 players
De Graafschap players
FC Twente players
Borussia Mönchengladbach players
Newcastle United F.C. players
PSV Eindhoven players
Sevilla FC players
FC Barcelona players
Eredivisie players
Bundesliga players
Premier League players
La Liga players
UEFA Europa League winning players
Netherlands youth international footballers
Netherlands under-21 international footballers
Netherlands international footballers
UEFA Euro 2012 players
UEFA Euro 2020 players
2022 FIFA World Cup players
Dutch expatriate footballers
Expatriate footballers in England
Expatriate footballers in Germany
Expatriate footballers in Spain
Dutch expatriate sportspeople in England
Dutch expatriate sportspeople in Germany
Dutch expatriate sportspeople in Spain